A. B. Jackson may refer to:

 A. B. Jackson (poet) (born 1965), Scottish poet
 A. B. Jackson (painter) (1925–1981), African-American painter
 Brian Jackson (cricketer) (A. B. Jackson, born 1933), English cricketer

See also
Jackson (surname)